Lough Craghy, also locally known as Tully Lake, is a freshwater lake in the northwest of Ireland. It is located in north County Donegal in the Rosses fishery.

Geography and hydrology
The lake drains westwards into Dunglow Lough.

Natural history
Fish species in Lough Craghy include sea trout. These trout are seasonal, present in summer only.

See also
List of loughs in Ireland

References

Craghy
Craghy